The following highways are numbered 888:

Israel
  Route 888 (Israel)

United States
  Florida State Road 888
  Louisiana Highway 888
  Pennsylvania Route 888
  Puerto Rico Highway 888
  Texas Farm-to-Market Road 888